Flask Glacier, is a gently-sloping glacier,  long, flowing east from Bruce Plateau to enter Scar Inlet between Daggoo Peak and Spouter Peak in Graham Land, Antarctica. The lower reaches of this glacier were surveyed and photographed by the Falklands Islands Dependencies Survey (FIDS) in 1947. The entire glacier was photographed by the Falkland Islands and Dependencies Aerial Survey Expedition in 1955–56, and mapped by the FIDS in 1957. It was named by the UK Antarctic Place-names Committee after the third mate on the Pequod in Herman Melville's Moby-Dick; or, The White Whale.

Tributary glaciers 
 Ambergris Glacier
 Belogradchik Glacier

See also 
 List of glaciers in the Antarctic
 List of Antarctic ice streams
 Glaciology

Further reading 
 T. A. Scambos, J. A. Bohlander, C. A. Shuman, P. Skvarca, 'https://agupubs.onlinelibrary.wiley.com/doi/10.1029/2004GL020670  Glacier acceleration and thinning after ice shelf collapse in the Larsen B embayment, Antarctica], The Cryosphere, Volume 31, Issue 18, 22 September 2004 https://doi.org/10.1029/2004GL020670
 Farinotti, Daniel, Corr, Hugh, Gudmundsson, G. Hilmar, The ice thickness distribution of Flask Glacier, Antarctic Peninsula, determined by combining radio-echo soundings, surface velocity data and flow modelling, Annals of Glaciology / 54, PP 18 - 24 https://doi.org/10.3189/2013AoG63A603
 Douglas Fox, Scientists Trek to Collapsing Glaciers to Assess Antarctica’s Meltdown and Sea-Level Rise,  SCIENTIFIC AMERICAN

External links 

 Flask Glacier on USGS website
 Flask Glacier on AADC website
 Flask Glacier on SCAR website

References 

Glaciers of Oscar II Coast